Wing Commander John Francis Durham "Tim" Elkington (23 December 1920 – 1 February 2019) was a British Royal Air Force (RAF) fighter pilot who flew during the Battle of Britain, and was one of the last surviving aircrew known as "The Few".

Early life
Elkington was born in Edgbaston near Birmingham on 23 December 1920, the only child of Alan Durham Elkington and his wife Isabel Frances (née Griffin). He was educated at Hockley Heath and Bedford School.

Military career
Elkington joined the Royal Air Force in September 1939 as a Flight Cadet at the Royal Air Force College Cranwell. Between October 1939 and April 1940 he trained at No. 9 Elementary Flying Training School at RAF Ansty. Elkington then undertook further training with No. 17 Service Flight Training School at RAF Cranwell. He was commissioned on 14 July 1940 and joined No. 1 Squadron RAF at RAF Northolt a day later and flew Hawker Hurricanes during the Battle of Britain. His first confirmed "kill" came on 15 August 1940, downing a Messerschmitt Bf 109.

A day later he was shot down and wounded on 16 August 1940 (research shows that he was shot down by Helmut Wick). After recuperating at the Royal West Sussex Hospital at Chichester he rejoined No. 1 Squadron on 1 October 1940 at RAF Wittering.

After a spell with No. 55 Operational Training Unit as an instructor, in late May 1941 he joined No. 601 Squadron RAF at RAF Manston. He was promoted to Flying Officer on 14 July 1941. From there he joined No. 134 Squadron RAF at RAF Leconfield in July 1941. Until mid-October 1941 Elkington took part in escorting bombers and also trained Russian pilots to fly the Hurricane. On 6 October 1941 Elkington  shot down a German bomber Junkers Ju 88 over Vayenga. He returned from Russia in January 1942.

In April 1942 he joined the Merchant Ship Fighter Unit (MSFU) at RAF Speke until August 1942. After a short period with No. 1 Squadron again, in September 1942, Elkington joined No. 539 Squadron RAF at RAF Acklington flying Hurricanes alongside Douglas A-20 Havoc aircraft on night operations. He was promoted Flight Lieutenant 14 October 1942.

After 539 Squadron was disbanded in late January 1943, he joined No. 197 Squadron RAF at RAF Drem flying the Hawker Typhoon. After operations from RAF Tangmere he was posted to No. 67 Squadron RAF at Alipore, Calcutta in December 1943. When the tour expired, Elkington spent three years commanding AFDU at RAF Amarda Road and he returned home in October 1946.

Post war
Elkington had a long and varied career, including a tour with an Avro Shackleton Squadron in Northern Ireland.

He was promoted to Squadron Leader in 1946 and Wing Commander in 1961. Elkington retired from the Royal Air Force on 23 December 1975.

Later life
After leaving the RAF, Elkington set up an art and picture-framing business.

References

External links
Aces of WW2 page on Tim (with Tim's notes)
Tim Elkington's Hurricane

1920 births
2019 deaths
Accidental deaths from falls
Royal Air Force officers
Royal Air Force pilots of World War II
Royal Air Force airmen
The Few
People from Edgbaston
People educated at Bedford School
Military personnel from Birmingham, West Midlands